A deliberative opinion poll, sometimes called a deliberative poll, is a form of opinion poll that incorporates the principles of deliberative democracy. Professor James S. Fishkin of Stanford University first described the concept in 1988.
The typical deliberative opinion poll takes a random, representative sample of citizens and engages them in deliberation on current issues or proposed policy changes through small-group discussions and conversations with competing experts to create more informed and reflective public opinion. A typical polling utilizes participants drawn from a random and representative sample to engage in small-group deliberations to create more informed and reflective public opinion. Deliberative polls have been tested around the world, including in the European Union, the United States, China, and Australia.

Process
The Center for Deliberative Democracy at Stanford University describes its process as follows:

Fishkin argues that during deliberation, discussion among participants should:
 be backed by truthful claims,
 include arguments both for and against the proposal,
 remain polite,
 involve an evaluation of arguments based solely on merit and
 cover a diverse array of perspectives from substantial portions of the population. 

Logistically, deliberative opinion polls are very similar to Danish consensus conferences. However, a deliberative poll is larger, from 100 to 200 participants, to increase representativeness.  In addition, instead of reaching a consensus, agreement or verdict at the end of deliberation, deliberative polling is interested in measuring opinion change. The goal is to allow the researcher to infer what choices citizens would arrive at if they could undergo an extensive process of deliberation about an issue.

Applications 
PBS has worked with Fishkin via the By the People Program on several deliberative opinion polls, including in 2004 when it sponsored several regional deliberative polls around topics related to the 2004 national elections.  In June 2011 PBS joined him in hosting What's Next California poll, with the results intend to inform a future California ballot initiative. In 2019, The Center for Deliberative Democracy and the Helena Group launched America in One Room, a Deliberative Poll of a representative sample of Americans on the policies and candidates behind the 2020 presidential election.

Inspired by deliberative polling, a group at Carnegie Mellon University created a tool for online deliberation. Their first tool is an Adobe Connect-based discussion tool called PICOLA. The Center for Deliberative Democracy at Stanford has also conducted online Deliberative Polls such as the 2007 project on dilemmas of citizenship conducted with the PBS Newshour. Recently, PASOK held a deliberative opinion poll to elect the party's candidate for the municipality of Amaroussion.

Fishkin and Yale Law Professor Bruce Ackerman have proposed a national holiday called Deliberation Day to allow voters to gather in large and small groups to discuss political issues.

Issues Deliberation Australia/America, a political psychology think-tank, has worked with the Australian government to use deliberative polling for several important local and national issues, including the referendum on becoming a republic in 1999.

Deliberative democracy was also employed in Brazil, in the state of Rio Grande do Sul, where citizens participated collectively for state planning. For two day, 226 Brazilians gathered in Porto Alegre to deliberate career reform in civil service, before actions were passed.

Deliberative polls have been held in China for over five years. The coastal township of Zeguo in Wenling city has a population of 120,000. Fishkin's team selects a sample who is representative of the general population. Deliberative polling takes place over a one- to three-day period, and the local government utilizes the priorities of the group. The experiment worked so well that the topic expanded from evaluating infrastructure projects the first year (prioritizing public works projects) to the entire budget, and the Chinese are considering the process in other municipalities.

Between 1996 and 1998, Fishkin managed deliberative opinion polls for eight investor-owned electric utilities in Texas as part of the states integrated resource planning process. The group's recommendations shifted their focus toward energy efficiency and wind power. With good information, there was a large shift in the percentage of customers who agreed that it was worth the higher cost to invest in energy efficiency and renewable resources.

Effectiveness
In a September 2010 Time magazine article, Joe Klein questioned whether regular citizens were capable of making sound decisions on complex and technical issues. Fishkin responded:

Contributions

Informed citizens
Participants can come to learn and appreciate the circumstances and interests of competing arguments through extended discussions and deliberations. This can be achieved by:
 randomly assigning participants into small groups and 
 having impartial moderators to ensure all the major arguments for and against major policy options are covered.

While participants become more engaged and knowledgeable, thoughtful conclusions are expected to emerge, leading to a better quality of public opinion. Furthermore, it is also hoped that such poll can help increase deliberation among all members of the public.

Service as input mechanisms
Deliberative polling can also solicit input from specialized sub-publics and serve as important input mechanisms upstream in the policy making process.

Disadvantages
Deliberative polls may not be suitable for every public concern. For instance, crisis measures that demand instant decisions would not be appropriate.

Furthermore, organizing such a poll costs a substantial sum of money. In particular, televising part of the content through mass media can be very expensive. Therefore, if neither the governing body nor other organizations are willing to fund such a poll, there is no way to get it started.

It can be expensive to get sufficient numbers of participants to create a good representative sample and improving the odds that members of more marginalized groups will attend. Since it's not a duty like jury duty, studies conducted so far require incentives, with costs that have included paying for the trips, the hotel and the food for each participant, and booking an attractive venue; in any case, hiring the research crew and moderators will incur costs. Additional costs have included paying for participants’ compensation so that the people who are randomly selected can put aside their duties to attend the events (e.g., providing childcare.)

Criticisms

Briefing materials
Some critics would say it is hard to ensure that briefing materials provided to participants are balanced and accurate. It is suggested that an advisory committee with a wide range of people are to be constituted; however, it can be challenging to obtain a balanced advisory committee in the first place. In this sense, it gives room for a biased and/or incomplete presentation of information.

Lack of representativeness
Deliberative polling requires those randomly sampled to gather at a single place to discuss the targeted issues. Those events are typically one to three days while online deliberations can take up to four to five weeks. Even though scientific random sampling are used and each person has an equal chance of being selected, not every selected individual will have the time and interest to join those events.

In real-world settings, attendance is low and highly selective, and there can be self-selection biases. Data supports such concern as only 300 out of 869 respondents took up the invitation to participate in actual deliberative meetings. What is more important is that those who attended and those who did not differed significantly, and some groups in society are found to be significantly more likely to attend public meetings than others. In general, those who participate tend to be those highly motivated and opinionated. In contrast, research papers from Stanford show that in general the samples are representative.

As both group dynamics and personalities of participants can play an important role in producing different outcomes of discussions, deliberations can inhibit the types of results Fishkin envisions.

Moderators
Although moderators are trained to minimize imbalances in deliberations, in many deliberative forums there is little empirical data on how well they actually facilitate discussions. However, in the deliberative polls, evaluation questions about the moderators are always included and they invariably are evaluated by the participants as being balanced in their facilitation and as not imposing or suggesting their own views.
Critics might say that careful moderation of discussions might create captive audiences in which participants behave differently from what is likely to occur in real-world settings. However, the point is to create an environment in which people are effectively motivated to consider competing arguments and become informed. Democratic institutions always raise questions of institutional design. This democratic design is intended to produce a representation of informed and thoughtful opinion and that is likely to be different from the inattentive and sound bite driven public opinion found in ordinary life.

Public involvement
Due to the limited number of participants, the general public might not be better informed. Only those drawn in the sample participate. This limitation cannot be solved by televising the events because the public might not even expose themselves to those specific programs. In fact, critics say spillovers from public meetings to broader social discourse are moderate at best.

In addition, in spite of potentially balanced and structured public meetings, televised coverage  critics might say that the discussions produce a situation in which the voices of the most vocal groups were amplified and the perceptions of majority opinions in turn did not reflect real opinion distributions. However, in the Deliberative Poll the opinions before and after deliberation are reported in confidential questions so perceptions of group discussion are not the basis for policy recommendations.

Not designed to measure broad public reaction
Although the researchers claim to be interested in measuring change in public opinion instead of reaching an agreed verdict,  such method has been used as inputs into policy-making process. The researchers hold that seeking consensus produces social pressure that distorts the measurement of opinion. Hence confidential questionnaires provide a better basis for measuring considered judgment. Indeed, deliberative polling in Texas has led to the largest-ever investments by Texas in renewable energy, conservation subsidies for low-income consumers, and lower prices for customers buying renewable energy. More recently, Fishkin again claims that deliberation polling should be used in key policy issues like energy. Nonetheless, critics might say that results derived from such public meetings might not reflect lay audiences’ views, and using them "as gauges of public reactions may produce policy choices that are diametrically opposed to public preferences." Defenders of deliberative polling would say that the process measures uninformed and disengaged opinion before deliberation and considered judgments when the public is more informed after deliberation. Public policymakers and the media get both from a deliberative poll and choose which they wish to listen to.

See also 
Citizens' assembly
Deliberation
Deliberative assembly
Deliberative democracy
Demarchy
Online deliberation
Opinion poll
Sortition

References

External links 
Center for Deliberative Democracy, Stanford University
By the People Program, Public Broadcasting System
Tomorrow's Europe, the first Europe wide deliberative Poll

Further reading
Becker, Ted. "Teledemocracy," The Futurist, December 1981
Fishkin, James S.: Democracy and Deliberation: New Directions for Democratic Reform, Yale University Press, 1991
Slaton Christa.: Televote.  New York: Praeger 1992
Becker, Ted and Christa Daryl Slaton. The Future of Teledemocracy. Westport, CT: Praeger, 2000

Types of polling
Political systems
Group decision-making